The tenth cycle of Britain's Next Top Model premiered on 14 January 2016 on Lifetime. This was the first cycle of the series to air on the network after the show was cancelled in 2013 during its original run on Sky Living from 2005 to 2013. The title of the show was changed back from Britain & Ireland's Next Top Model to Britain's Next Top Model due to licensing issues, although contestants from Ireland were still allowed to apply for the show.

The new cycle featured a completely revamped panel of judges. Former host Elle Macpherson was replaced by cycle 2 runner-up and model Abbey Clancy. The remaining panel of judges consisted of  male model Paul Sculfor, fashion photographer Nicky Johnston, and OBE fashion director and journalist Hilary Alexander. Clancy was the second Top Model alum to become a host of a national franchise, after Germany's Lena Gercke became the host of Austria's Next Topmodel in 2009.

The prizes for this cycle included a modelling contract with Models 1, a fashion spread in Cosmopolitan magazine, a nation-wide advertising campaign for Head & Shoulders as well as an additional campaign for Sleek Makeup along with a yearly supply of the brand's products, an appearance on The Clothes Show catwalk, and an all-expenses paid holiday trip to Barbados courtesy of Sandals Resorts.

The winner of the competition was 22-year-old Chloe Keenan from Birmingham. Keenan, who is originally from Conwy, is the first Welsh winner of the franchise.

Cast

Contestants
(Ages stated are at start of contest)

Judges
Abbey Clancy (host)
Hilary Alexander
Nicky Johnston
Paul Sculfor

Episodes

Results

 The contestant was eliminated
 The contestant quit the competition
 The contestant won the competition

Bottom two/three

 The contestant was eliminated after her first time in the bottom two/three
 The contestant was eliminated after her second time in the bottom two/three
 The contestant was eliminated after her fourth time in the bottom two/three
 The contestant quit the competition
 The contestant was eliminated in the final judging and placed as the runner-up

Average  call-out order
Final two is not included.

Notes

References

External links 
Official website

10
10
10
Television shows filmed in England
Television shows filmed in Croatia
Television shows filmed in Jamaica